In enzymology, an alginate synthase is an enzyme that catalyzes the chemical reaction

GDP-D-mannuronate + (alginate)n  GDP + (alginate)n+1

Thus, the two substrates of this enzyme are GDP-D-mannuronate and (alginate)n, whereas its two products are GDP and (alginate)n+1.

This enzyme belongs to the family of glycosyltransferases, specifically the hexosyltransferases.  The systematic name of this enzyme class is GDP-D-mannuronate:alginate D-mannuronyltransferase. This enzyme is also called mannuronosyl transferase.  This enzyme participates in fructose and mannose metabolism.

References

 

EC 2.4.1
Enzymes of unknown structure